Khosrov II (known in Roman sources as Chosroes, died 258), also known as Khosrov the Brave was an Armenian king from the Arsacid dynasty in the mid-third century.

Khosrov II was the son of Tiridates II, King of Armenia, and followed his father on the Armenian throne. He was the namesake of his paternal grandfather Khosrov I, and the Parthian monarchs Osroes I and Osroes II, who were also known as Khosrau. In Armenian sources, Khosrov is often confused with his grandfather. Little is known on his life prior to becoming king.

From 226 until 238, Tiridates was in military conflict with Ardashir I, the founder and first king of the Sassanid Empire. Ardashir wanted to expand his empire by conquering Armenia.  Khosrov's father had stubbornly resisted Ardashir.  After twelve years of fighting, Tiridates was defeated by Ardashir, who nonetheless withdrew his army, and left Armenia.  Khosrov participated in his father's military campaigns against Ardashir, who was alarmed by their victories.

Tiridates II died in 252, and Khosrov II succeeded his father as King of Armenia. When Khosrov became king, his capital was Vagharshapat.  He had two children: a daughter, Khosrovidukht, and a son, Tiridates.

In 258, Khosrov was murdered by Anak the Parthian. Like Khosrov, Anak was related to the Arsacids. Ardashir and his son, Shapur I, incited Anak to murder Khosrov, promising to return Anak's domain as a reward.  Anak went to Vagharshapat (now just outside of Yerevan), where he won Khosrov's trust, and treacherously murdered the king, along with his wife.  The outraged Armenian nobles slew Anak and his entire family, except for his infant son, Gregory, who was taken to Cappadocia by his caretakers, Sopia and Yevtagh, who escaped the slaughter of Anak's family. And eventually became patron saint and first official head of the Armenian Apostolic Church, through converting Armenia from paganism to Christianity in 301.

Ardashir took possession of Armenia, which became a part of his empire.  However, troops loyal to Khosrov had taken his son, Tiridates, to Rome for protection.  Tiridates was raised in Rome, while his sister, Khosrovidukht was raised at Caesarea Mazaca in Cappadocia.  Khosrovidukht's foster father was Awtay, a nobleman from the family of the Amatunik; Awtay's wife was a noblewoman of the family of the Slkunik.

In 298, Tiridates was restored to the Armenian throne by the emperor Diocletian, ruling until about 330.  Tiridates may have instructed Agathangelos to write a biography on the life and kingship of Khosrov II.

References

Sources
 
 
 
 

3rd-century kings of Armenia
Roman client kings of Armenia
People executed by the Sasanian Empire
268 deaths
3rd-century murdered monarchs
Arsacid kings of Armenia